The Johor Bahru–Pasir Gudang Elevated Expressway (JOPGEX) is a new expressway under planning in Johor Bahru, Johor, Malaysia. The 50-kilometre (30 miles) expressway connects Tampoi, Tebrau, Plentong and Pasir Gudang. This project is part of the Iskandar Malaysia (formerly South Johor Economic Region (SJER) or Iskandar Development Region (IDR)) will be built to resolve traffic jams and accident prone problems along Pasir Gudang Highway (Federal Route 17).

List of interchanges

External links
 Johor Bahru–Pasir Gudang Elevated Expressway (JOPGEX) on Beta Group International website

Expressways and highways in Johor
Proposed roads in Malaysia